Almatret is a municipality in the comarca of the Segrià in Catalonia, Spain.

The town is standing on a hill overlooking the Ebre River. Almatret has lost population since year 1920 when it had 1545 inhabitants. The economy is based on the produce of the olive and almond trees growing on the dry slopes of this hilly area.

See also
Puntal dels Escambrons

References

External links 

 Pàgina web de l'Ajuntament
 Government data pages 

Municipalities in Segrià
Populated places in Segrià